Kyle Leon Wootton (born 11 October 1996) is an English professional footballer who plays as a forward for Stockport County.

Career

Scunthorpe
Wootton made his first-team debut for Scunthorpe United on 26 August 2014, in a 1–0 loss in the second round of the League Cup at home to Reading. He signed an 18-month professional contract in January 2015. In the 2015–16 season, he spent two months on loan at Lincoln City of the National League, and in September 2016 he joined another National League club,
North Ferriby United, on loan until January 2017. On 26 January 2017, Wootton joined League Two side Cheltenham Town on loan for the remainder of the 2016–17 campaign.

Wootton joined Halifax Town on a one-month loan deal on 29 September 2018.

Notts County
Wootton signed for Notts County on loan at the beginning of the 2019–20 season.
He scored his first for the Magpies in their 1–1 draw away at Sutton United on Saturday 7 September 2019. This was the first of a three game scoring streak. On 8 January 2020, Wootton signed a 30-month contract with Notts County for a fee of £60,000. Wootton scored four braces in his first season wearing Black and White against Boreham Wood, Halifax Town, Chesterfield FC and Eastleigh FC respectively. He would finish that season top goal scorer for the club.

Stockport County

On 9 June 2022, Wootton joined newly-promoted Stockport County on a free transfer, signing a three-year deal.

Career statistics

References

External links

 

1996 births
Living people
English footballers
Association football forwards
Scunthorpe United F.C. players
Lincoln City F.C. players
North Ferriby United A.F.C. players
Cheltenham Town F.C. players
Stevenage F.C. players
Notts County F.C. players
English Football League players
National League (English football) players
Black British sportspeople
Stockport County F.C. players